The 2004–05 Western Kentucky Hilltoppers men's basketball team represented Western Kentucky University during the 2004–05 NCAA Division I men's basketball season. The Hilltoppers were led by head coach Darrin Horn and All Sun Belt Conference guard, Anthony Winchester. They finished 2nd in the  SBC East Division and were invited to the 2005 National Invitation Tournament.  
Future NBA player Courtney Lee was SBC Freshman of the Year and was named to the SBC All Tournament team.

Schedule

|-
!colspan=6| Regular Season
 
|-

|-
!colspan=6| 2005 Sun Belt Conference men's basketball tournament

|-
!colspan=6| 2005 National Invitation Tournament

References

Western Kentucky
Western Kentucky Hilltoppers basketball seasons
Western Kentucky
Western Kentucky Basketball, Men's
Western Kentucky Basketball, Men's